Brent Robert Barry (born December 31, 1971), also known by the nickname "Bones", is an American basketball executive, broadcaster and former player. He is the current vice president of basketball operations for the San Antonio Spurs. The shooting guard played professionally in the National Basketball Association (NBA), winning two league championships with the Spurs in 2005 and 2007, and also won the Slam Dunk Contest in 1996. He is the son of former NBA player Rick Barry.

After retiring, Barry worked as a sports commentator for the NBA on TNT and was a studio host for the NBA TV show NBA Gametime. In 2018, he returned to the Spurs as an executive. He is also a commentator of the NBA 2K series and has been a commentator since the release of NBA 2K21.

Playing career
Brent Barry was selected by the Denver Nuggets in the first round (15th pick) of the 1995 NBA draft, but was traded to the Los Angeles Clippers on draft night in a 4-player trade with Rodney Rogers for the No. 2 overall pick in the draft (Antonio McDyess) and Randy Woods. Barry was generally considered a good passer and had three seasons where he averaged more than 5 assists per game. Barry was also a strong three-point shooter; he currently ranks 13th all-time in career three-point field goals made and shot 40% from behind the arc for his career. These two strengths, combined with Barry's 6'7" frame, allowed him to play a variety of positions, including point guard, shooting guard, and small forward; because he was taller than most traditional point guards, he was often considered a point forward when he was running the offense. He was on the San Antonio Spurs championship teams in 2005 and 2007. He won the Slam Dunk Contest in the NBA All-Star Weekend in 1996 with a Julius Erving-inspired slam dunk in which he took off from the free throw line to sail in and dunk one-handed. He was the first Caucasian player to win the competition.

Los Angeles Clippers (1995–1998)
After being drafted by the Denver Nuggets, Barry was traded immediately to the Los Angeles Clippers. In his rookie season, Brent made 123 3-pointers, which broke the current rookie record. There Brent would average 10.4 ppg and 38% 3-pt field goal in 179 games. In his second season, he and the Clippers attempted a playoff run where Brent would average 11.7 ppg, his highest in the postseason. The Clippers only played in 3 games (one series; 1996–1997) during the postseason while Barry was there.

Miami Heat (1998)
Barry was traded to the Miami Heat the day before the February 20 trade deadline from Los Angeles for Isaac Austin. In Miami, Barry would only play 17 games, not starting any of them, averaging only 4.1 ppg.

Chicago Bulls (1999)
Barry signed with the Bulls on January 25, 1999 and signed a 6-year $27 million contract. After sustaining an injury, he played only 37 of the 50 games played that season, starting 30 of those games, averaging 11.1 ppg. Failing to fill the void of a Jordan-less Bulls, the team traded Brent for Hersey Hawkins and James Cotton from Seattle on August 12, 1999.

Seattle SuperSonics (1999–2004)
Brent spent 4 seasons with the Seattle SuperSonics. Brent would begin his Seattle career as a back-up for fellow Oregon State alumnus Gary Payton. He would eventually move to play the point position as a starter, and filled in when needed as a small forward. There he would average 11.2 ppg, make 669 3-point shots, and start the majority of his NBA career (296 out of 328 games), and total 4,107 points. In Seattle he would play 10 postseason games, starting 8 of those, the most in his career thus far.

San Antonio Spurs (2004–2008)
In the summer of 2004, Barry was signed as a free agent by the San Antonio Spurs, where he spent most of the season as a backup. After losing their first playoff game to the Denver Nuggets in the 2005 NBA Playoffs, San Antonio inserted Barry into the starting lineup. The Spurs' new lineup helped them beat the Nuggets in the series four games to one. Later in those same playoffs, Barry earned his first championship ring when the Spurs defeated the Detroit Pistons in the 2005 NBA Finals.
Brent and his father, Rick Barry, are the second father-son duo to each win an NBA Championship as a player; the first was Matt Guokas, Sr. and his son Matt Guokas, Jr. The only other father-son duos are Bill Walton and his son Luke Walton, Mychal Thompson and his son Klay Thompson and Gary Payton and his son Gary Payton II.

In June 2007, he won his second NBA championship ring when the Spurs swept the Cleveland Cavaliers 4–0.

In January 2008, Barry tore his right calf muscle. On February 20, 2008, (not too long after his injury) Barry, along with Francisco Elson and a 2009 first round draft pick, were traded by the San Antonio Spurs back to the Seattle SuperSonics in exchange for forward/center Kurt Thomas. Barry was waived the following day by the Sonics. After a mandatory 30-day waiting period, he re-signed with San Antonio on March 24, 2008 for 1 year with the possibility for the 2009–2010 season at Veteran Minimum.

Coming off of injury Barry did not see very much playing time in the first 2 rounds of the 2008 NBA Playoffs. Barry would shine against the Lakers in the Western Conference finals, however, getting 23 points in Game 4, with a controversial no-call foul with 2 seconds on the clock. The Spurs would lose the series in 5 games, however.

San Antonio provided Barry with the most playoff experience (71 games) of his career. He totaled 356 3-point shots made and 1,888 points.

Houston Rockets (2008–2009)
Barry opted out of his contract and became a free agent on July 1, 2008. On July 10, Barry signed a 2-year contract with the Houston Rockets, becoming the third member of the family to join the franchise. His father, Rick, ended his career playing two seasons with the Rockets (1978–1980) and his older brother, Jon, also finished his career with the Rockets, playing from 2004 to 06. Financial terms were not released.

Brent's other brother Richard Francis "Scooter" Barry IV (born August 13, 1966) is also a retired American professional basketball player.

On October 23, 2009, Brent Barry's career ended when he was cut by the Rockets at the end of training camp, leading Barry to later remark that "all the Barrys were buried in Houston".

Post-playing career
In 2013, Barry began making regular appearances on NBA TV's The Starters in his own segment: "The Bone Zone". He was a fill-in analyst for the NBA on TNT coverage, and was a play-by-play announcer for their Players Only broadcast starting in 2016. He was partnered with Ian Eagle for TNT's coverage of the 2018 NBA Playoffs.

In 2018, Barry joined the San Antonio Spurs' front office as their vice president of basketball operations.

Personal life
Barry, born in Hempstead, New York, is the son of Hall of Famer Rick Barry, and was arguably the best player of the five basketball-playing Barry sons, the others being Scooter, Jon, Drew, and Canyon. His stepmother, Lynn Barry, also was an accomplished basketball player in college. Brent, the second youngest, played his high school basketball at athletic powerhouse De La Salle High School in Concord, California, and graduated in 1990. Barry played four years on the Beavers basketball team of Oregon State University after redshirting his freshman season. Barry graduated from Oregon State with a Bachelor of Arts degree in sociology in 1995.

Brent and Erin Barry were married in 1998, after being together from the time they were both in high school. They have two sons. In 2010, it was reported that Brent Barry had filed for divorce, citing "irreconcilable differences". In December 2010 Erin Barry issued a statement denying the reports about an extra-marital affair with teammate Tony Parker being the cause of their separation. The divorce became final on January 5, 2011, in Texas; they have joint custody of the children.

NBA career statistics

Regular season

|-
| style="text-align:left;"|
| style="text-align:left;"|L.A. Clippers
| 79 || 44 || 24.0 || .474 || .416 || .810 || 2.1 || 2.9 || 1.2 || .3 || 10.1
|-
| style="text-align:left;"|
| style="text-align:left;"|L.A. Clippers
| 59 || 0 || 18.5 || .409 || .324 || .817 || 1.9 || 2.6 || .9 || .3 || 7.5
|-
| style="text-align:left;"|
| style="text-align:left;"|L.A. Clippers
| 41 || 36 || 32.7 || .428 || .400 || .844 || 3.5 || 3.2 || 1.2 || .6 || 13.7
|-
| style="text-align:left;"|
| style="text-align:left;"|Miami
| 17 || 0 || 15.2 || .371 || .353 || 1.000 || 1.6 || 1.2 || .8 || .2 || 4.1
|-
| style="text-align:left;"|
| style="text-align:left;"|Chicago
| 37 || 30 || 31.9 || .396 || .302 || .772 || 3.9 || 3.1 || 1.1 || .3 || 11.1
|-
| style="text-align:left;"|
| style="text-align:left;"|Seattle
| 80 || 74 || 34.1 || .463 || .411 || .809 || 4.7 || 3.6 || 1.3 || .4 || 11.8
|-
| style="text-align:left;"|
| style="text-align:left;"|Seattle
| 67 || 20 || 26.5 || .494 || .476 || .816 || 3.1 || 3.4 || 1.2 || .2 || 8.8
|-
| style="text-align:left;"|
| style="text-align:left;"|Seattle
| 81 || 81 || 37.5 || .508 || .424 || .846 || 5.4 || 5.3 || 1.8 || .5 || 14.4
|-
| style="text-align:left;"|
| style="text-align:left;"|Seattle
| 75 || 68 || 33.1 || .458 || .403 || .795 || 4.0 || 5.1 || 1.5 || .2 || 10.3
|-
| style="text-align:left;"|
| style="text-align:left;"|Seattle
| 59 || 53 || 30.6 || .504 || .452 || .827 || 3.5 || 5.8 || 1.4 || .3 || 10.8
|-
| style="text-align:left; background:#afe6ba;"|†
| style="text-align:left;"|San Antonio
| 81 || 8 || 21.5 || .423 || .357 || .837 || 2.3 || 2.2 || .5 || .2 || 7.4
|-
| style="text-align:left;"|
| style="text-align:left;"|San Antonio
| 74 || 5 || 17.0 || .452 || .396 || .661 || 2.1 || 1.7 || .5 || .4 || 5.8
|-
| style="text-align:left; background:#afe6ba;"|†
| style="text-align:left;"|San Antonio
| 75 || 28 || 21.7 || .475 || .446 || .880 || 2.1 || 1.8 || .7 || .2 || 8.5
|-
| style="text-align:left;"|
| style="text-align:left;"|San Antonio
| 31 || 1 || 17.9 || .481 || .429 || .950 || 1.8 || 1.7 || .5 || .1 || 7.1
|-
| style="text-align:left;"|
| style="text-align:left;"|Houston
| 56 || 1 || 15.3 || .407 || .374 || .950 || 1.7 || 1.4 || .4 || .1 || 3.7
|-
| style="text-align:center;" colspan="2"|Career 
| 912 || 449 || 25.9 || .460 || .405 || .823 || 3.0 || 3.2 || 1.0 || .3 || 9.3

Playoffs

|-
| style="text-align:left;"|1997
| style="text-align:left;"|L.A. Clippers
| 3 || 0 || 28.0 || .407 || .455 || .889 || 2.3 || 3.3 || 1.3 || .0 || 11.7
|-
| style="text-align:left;"|2000
| style="text-align:left;"|Seattle
| 5 || 3 || 31.0 || .364 || .400 || .714 || 2.6 || 3.0 || .6 || .6 || 8.4
|-
| style="text-align:left;"|2002
| style="text-align:left;"|Seattle
| 5 || 5 || 29.8 || .412 || .438 || 1.000 || 4.6 || 2.8 || .6 || .8 || 7.8
|-
| style="text-align:left; background:#afe6ba;"|2005†
| style="text-align:left;"|San Antonio
| 23 || 8 || 24.1 || .457 || .424 || .810 || 2.4 || 1.9 || .7 || .2 || 6.1
|-
| style="text-align:left;"|2006
| style="text-align:left;"|San Antonio
| 13 || 2 || 23.2 || .557 || .500 || .762 || 2.5 || 1.7 || .7 || .2 || 7.8
|-
| style="text-align:left; background:#afe6ba;"|2007†
| style="text-align:left;"|San Antonio
| 19 || 0 || 11.8 || .350 || .306 || 1.000 || 1.3 || 1.1 || .2 || .1 || 3.1
|-
| style="text-align:left;"|2008
| style="text-align:left;"|San Antonio
| 16 || 0 || 14.2 || .491 || .463 || .800 || 1.1 || 1.1 || .4 || .1 || 5.2
|-
| style="text-align:left;"|2009
| style="text-align:left;"|Houston
| 4 || 0 || 8.8 || .500 || .375 || .000 || 1.0 || .8 || .5 || .0 || 3.3
|- class="sortbottom"
| style="text-align:center;" colspan="2"|Career
| 88 || 18 || 19.7 || .446 || .416 || .802 || 2.0 || 1.7 || .5 || .2 || 5.8

References

External links
 

1971 births
Living people
American men's basketball players
American people of Lithuanian descent
Basketball players from California
Basketball players from New York (state)
Chicago Bulls players
Denver Nuggets draft picks
Houston Rockets players
Los Angeles Clippers players
Miami Heat players
Oregon State Beavers men's basketball players
People from Hempstead (village), New York
San Antonio Spurs players
Seattle SuperSonics players
Shooting guards
De La Salle High School (Concord, California) alumni